"The Diary" is a song by Neil Sedaka and Howard Greenfield. It was released in 1958 as Sedaka's debut single.

Background
This song's writers, Sedaka and Howard Greenfield, were inspired to write the song after asking for (and being refused) access to their client Connie Francis's diary in hopes of mining it for lyrical material. They originally wrote this song for Little Anthony & The Imperials. (It had a very similar sound to that group's first hit, "Tears on My Pillow".) The pair took the song to George Goldner, The Imperials' producer, over at End Records, who, although having the group record and release the song as an End Records single, felt that it wasn't quite done the way they felt it should have been done. The Imperials' version didn't chart, so Sedaka took it and decided that he should record the song himself. "The Diary" was issued on Sedaka's 1959 first solo album Rock with Sedaka on RCA. It was reissued on his 1961 record Neil Sedaka Sings Little Devil and His Other Hits, and again in 1963 on the album Neil Sedaka Sings His Greatest Hits.

Reception
Sedaka's version became his very first hit. The single reached No. 14 on the US Billboard chart, and No. 15 in Canada.

References

1958 debut singles
Neil Sedaka songs
Songs written by Neil Sedaka
Songs with lyrics by Howard Greenfield
Little Anthony and the Imperials songs
1958 songs
End Records singles
RCA Records singles